Jayne Wisener (born 19 May 1987) is an actress and singer from Northern Ireland. She played Johanna in the British-American film Sweeney Todd: The Demon Barber of Fleet Street. She also appeared in an episode of The Inbetweeners as Lauren Harris.

Personal life

On 6 July 2012, Jayne married Wayne Austin in her hometown of Coleraine, Northern Ireland. In January 2019, Jayne gave birth to their first child, Michael.

Background
Wisener was born in Ballymoney and grew up in Coleraine, Northern Ireland, where she attended the Coleraine High School for girls.

In 2005, she represented Antrim in the Rose of Tralee competition and finished 32nd out of 32 entries. Wisener also was part of Musical Theatre 4 Youth, and appeared in a workshop production of Falling.

While performing in a youth production of West Side Story at the Millennium Forum in Derry, Wisener was spotted by a talent scout, who asked her to audition for a role in Sweeney Todd. Wisener was, at age 19, deemed to look too old to play the 15-year-old Johanna Barker. When told this, Wisener "e-mailed them some pictures [of herself] without make-up. Usually looking young does [an actress] no favours at all but [she was] quite pleased this time".

She trained at the Royal Scottish Academy of Music and Drama for one year but left after landing the role of Johanna in Sweeney Todd.

Wisener made her stage debut in the UK premiere of the musical Parade at the Donmar Warehouse theatre in 2007.

She appeared in Boogeyman 3 playing the role of Amy and in November 2008 created the role of Sophie in a West End showcase of the new musical The Lost Christmas by Laurence Mark Wythe at the Trafalgar Studios, London.

In 2009 she appeared in an episode of The Inbetweeners – "The Field Trip" Series 2 Episode 1.

In late 2009, until early 2010 she appeared on stage playing the role of Mary Lennox in The Secret Garden at the West Yorkshire Playhouse.

In March 2011 she played Sally, a young woman in a centre for female juvenile delinquents, in The Runaway, based on Martina Cole's novel.

From 2012 to 2015 she played the role of student Sandie Morrow, in the BBC Northern Ireland drama Six Degrees 

Jayne also played the lead character 'Jay' in 2012 UK feature film, Life Just Is. She starred alongside Paul Nicholls and the two play a couple trying to work out their complex relationship. The film was not a success.

From December 2012 to January 2013, Jayne starred as Cinderella in The Grand Opera House, Belfast pantomime.

Select credits

References

External links
 

Living people
Women singers from Northern Ireland
Film actresses from Northern Ireland
Irish film actresses
Musical theatre actresses from Northern Ireland
Stage actresses from Northern Ireland
Television actresses from Northern Ireland
People from Ballymoney
People from Coleraine, County Londonderry
Alumni of the Royal Conservatoire of Scotland
1987 births
21st-century actresses from Northern Ireland
Musicians from County Antrim
Musicians from County Londonderry